"Human After All" is a song by electronic music duo Daft Punk. It is the title track from their third studio album, Human After All, and the third single from the album, released on 21 October 2005. The single release includes remixes of the song which appeared in the album Human After All: Remixes. "Human After All" peaked at number 93 on the French Singles Chart.

Background 
"Human After All" is the only single from the album released without an accompanying music video. Daft Punk had originally set to make a video, but it eventually became the feature film Daft Punk's Electroma co-written and directed by the duo.

Daft Punk produced the Teriyaki Boyz song "Heartbreaker", which features elements of "Human After All". MTV Australia used the coda of "Human After All" in its "coming up" section of their channel format. A remixed version of the song made an appearance in the video game DJ Hero 2.

On the album Alive 2007, "Human After All" appears with the track "Superheroes" from the album Discovery (2001) and "Rock'n Roll" from Homework (1997). The song also appeared on the encore on the bonus disc of Alive 2007, mixed along with Together's eponymous song, a reprise of "One More Time" from Discovery and Stardust's song "Music Sounds Better with You".

Track listing

Vinyl 
 12-inch vinyl

 12-inch vinyl (unreleased remixes)

Compact Disc 
 CD maxi-single 

The CD featured a misprinted track list on the rear of the disc case. It listed the SebastiAn remix as the second track, the Justice remix as the third track, and the Emperor Machine version as the fifth track. A promo 12-inch single was also released with the proper track list, with side A containing the first three tracks and side B containing the remaining three.

Charts

Release history

References 

2005 singles
Daft Punk songs
Songs written by Guy-Manuel de Homem-Christo
Songs written by Thomas Bangalter
2005 songs
Virgin Records singles